Ski Bluewood, formerly known as "Bluewood Ski Area," is an alpine ski area in the northwestern United States, in southeastern Washington.

In addition to Walla Walla, Bluewood is the closest alpine ski area (in mileage) to the Tri-Cities to the west, and the closest chairlift-served area to   Lewiston-Clarkston.

History 
Originally conceived in the 1960s, and created by Skyline Basin Associates during the 1970s, the ski area's original name (as a concept) was "Skyline Basin." After years of planning, fundraising, and approval procedures, the ski area opened as "Bluewood Ski Area" in January 1980.

The second season of 1980–81 was a very poor snow year, with only three days of skiing, and the fledgling ski area filed for Chapter 11 bankruptcy protection in August 1981. Auctioned off two years later and acquired by Rainier Bank, it was purchased for $550,000 in October 1983 by Portland executive Stan Goodell, a former president of the ski patrol at Mount Hood. To distance itself from the past financial difficulties, Goodell renamed it "Ski Bluewood" and relocated to Dayton to run the area himself.

It joined the existing lifts, the Skyline Express triple chair and Easy Rider platter lift, which was relocated.

Alpine skiing 
Of its 24 runs, Bluewood has 4 green circles (easiest), 12 blue squares (more difficult), and 8 black diamonds (most difficult). Additionally, there is one terrain park and six backcountry runs. The area is open five days per week, Wednesday through Sunday, plus holidays.  Bluewood has a reputation for dry powder snow, tree skiing, and a family-friendly atmosphere.

Will Brandenburg, a World Cup racer with the U.S. Ski Team, learned to ski and race at Bluewood in the 1990s.

Base Facilities 
Ski Bluewood facilities include a full-service ski/snowboard rental department, retail shop, patrol services, ski and snowboard learning center, cafe, and pub.

Bluewood is one of the few resorts in the country that is 100% self-sufficient, generating all of its own electric power via diesel generators. There are two diesel generators in the basement, one that runs the lodge at night and the other that runs the lodge and the two electric chair lifts during the day. The main chairlift (Skyline Express) has its own separate diesel powered generator, connected via a clutch and fluid coupler. The Triple Nickel and pama lifts are electric and uses power from the main diesel generators, located in the basement of the lodge.

References

External links
 
 Ski Bluewood Alpine Race Team
 Ski Map.org – trail maps – Ski Bluewood

Ski areas and resorts in Washington (state)
Buildings and structures in Columbia County, Washington
Tourist attractions in Columbia County, Washington
Umatilla National Forest